1000 was a webcomic created by Chuck Brown and Sanford Greene and published in WEBTOON from 2017 to 2018. The webcomic tells the story of Dragon Son, a supreme entity who have abandoned the creation and now have to complete a thousand acts of repentance.

In 2018, 1000 has received Ringo Awards for Best Webcomic.

References

Webtoons